Jiahui Wu (born August 19, 1981) is a Malaysian singer, songwriter, and producer. He is an exclusive writer at Warner/Chappell Music.

Career

Early career 
Wu started writing songs in middle school and began performing in music restaurants at the age of 15. Two years later, he joined the famous Malaysian songwriting group “Qingguangchang - Gengmenggongzuofang 青廣場 - 耕夢工作坊". At that time, he wrote his first song “Xing Zhi Wu Yu 星之物語" with his friend Haiwei Chen. The song didn’t win an award in the national competition, so the two revised the song. In 2002, Warner Music found potential in their work and signed Wu as an exclusive writer. The song was later awarded “Top 10 Original Singles" and "Best Original Song (local)” at the 8th Malaysia PWH Music Award. Moreover, it’s been released as the main hit “Yi Gong Chi 一公尺” in Jerry Yan’s first album.

Songwriter and producer 
In 2003, Wu’s work “Ventriloquism 腹語術" was recognized by three prominent singers at the same time: Jacky Cheung, Faye Wong, and Karen Mok. It was finally published in Karen Mok’s "X" album, as the first song Wu officially published. Since then, Wu has released numerous songs in various singers’ albums. In 2004, Jacky Cheung selected his song “Black and White ⿊⽩畫映" in the album "Black&White Collection”. It serves as another milestone in Wu's songwriting career.

His published works include Andy Lau's “Yi Kuai Qian 壹塊錢", Stefanie Sun's “Wish you Happiness 祝你開心", “Needing You 需要你", Karen Mok’s “Yi Kou Yi Kou 一口一口", “Buo He 薄荷", Tanya Chua’s “Cheng Ai 塵埃", Matilda Tao’s “Shui Wan Wan 水灣灣", Claire Kuo's “Bu Shuo 不說”, Amber Kuo’s “Love & Love”, Nicholas Teo’s “Ping Jing Qu 平靜曲”, etc. He has worked with singers such as Nicholas Tse, Michelle Vickie, Leon Lai, Gigi Leung, Elva Hsiao, Momo Wu, Rainie Yang, Waa Wei, Kit Chan, Julia Peng, etc.

Singer 
Wu's demo “Sui Ran Wo Yuan Yi 雖然我願意” has left a strong impression to Eric Ng, a well-known producer in the Chinese music industry that Ng rushed from Singapore to Penang, Malaysia to meet with Wu. After the two talked, Ng appreciates the talent and elegant voice of Wu, and was impressed by his passion for music, on top of his ambitions, dreams, and the humble attitude to learn. Ng decided to offer a singer contract to him, leaving Jonathan Lee with regrets that he wasn’t fast enough to sign Wu for his talents and unique voice.

In 2007, Wu and his friend Shuo Hsiao co-wrote and sang “Ai! Ai 唉! 愛”, a song widely discussed among fans in Taiwan. In early 2008, Wu published one of his most well-known pieces, “Yi Ren Yi Ban 一人一半”, serving as the theme song for the popular Singaporean movie "881". The song stayed on the charts for 15 weeks, and ranked second place on the Singapore radio “YES93.3 Pop Radio Charts". The same year in April, Wu released his first solo album “Sui Ran Wo Yuan Yi 雖然我願意” in Singapore, and sold 3,000 copies in Singapore in just a month.

In 2009, Wu officially released his album in Taiwan, “I Crazy You 我瘋你", and went on the concert tour "88 LIVE”, performing on school campuses and in live houses. He completed 88 live performances in five months, and completed the 101st performance in 2010.

In October 2011, Wu released a mini-album “Ni Ai Wo Ma 妳愛我嗎" in his hometown, Malaysia. The album was later released in Taiwan and other Asian countries. This album has been awarded in the Global Chinese Music Awards and Malaysia PWH Music Awards.

Entrepreneur 
In 2012, Wu established his own music production studio "Dreammy Studio" in Malaysia, and won the award of “Outstanding Singer in Malaysia” in the 2012 Global Chinese Music Awards. In 2013, he released an album under his own music brand Dreammy Studio, “Jiahui Wu x Cheryl Lee - THE IMPRESSOUL 01”, in which he and Cheryl Lee collaborated with each other in songwriting.

In 2014, Wu established "SmallBox Music", a music company that manages music production and copyrights of songs. The company signs and cultivates talents for songwriting, arranging and production. In the recent years, the company has published works of many singers, including Jane Zhang, Della, FansiR, Janice M. Vidal, Victor Wong, Nicholas Teo, Z Chen, Priscilla Abby, etc. Many songs were also written to be the theme songs of TV shows or movies, and they were nominated as the "Best Chinese Soundtrack" at the 2020 AIM Chinese Music Awards.

Artistry 
When working on a production case, Wu will try to understand the singer and create a stronger bond with each other. Malaysian singer Jyin Poh once shared that she feels that Wu is like a comedian, because he would perform magic tricks, and fool around by changing the lyrics to imitate Andy Lau and Aaron Kwok. Despite his many humorous actions, Wu is very rigorous at work. He gives singers a lot of freedom, and encourages them to let go of their self-doubt. He would inspire the singers and remind them of the original happiness and passion they have for music.

Personal life 
At the end of 2019, Wu announced his marriage with the Malaysian singer Sherry Chen on his social media. They were wearing rings to show a successful marriage proposal. The couple registered as husband and wife in 2020.

Albums

2008
《雖然我願意》（CD+DVD）（Released in Malaysia and Singapore）──2008, 4/14

2009
《我瘋你》（CD）──2009, 12/25

Single CD [Black & White] Collection

2011
《你愛我嗎？》（CD）──2011, 10/18

2013
《The Impressoul 01》（CD）──2013, 6/3

Songwriting

2003

2004

2005

2006

2007

2008

2009

2010

2011

2012

2013

2014

2015

2016

2017